Argent Apartments is a historic apartment house located at Glens Falls, Warren County, New York.  It was built about 1895 and is a rectangular, three story, frame building covered by a slate mansard roof and clapboard sheathing. At the corners are three story towers with open galleries.  It features two tiered porches with turned posts and balustrades.

It was added to the National Register of Historic Places in 1984.

References

Residential buildings on the National Register of Historic Places in New York (state)
Queen Anne architecture in New York (state)
Renaissance Revival architecture in New York (state)
Residential buildings completed in 1895
Buildings and structures in Warren County, New York
Glens Falls, New York
National Register of Historic Places in Warren County, New York